Nicholas Staggins (died 13 June 1700) was an English composer.

Staggins first studied music under his father. He was made Master of the King's Music by Charles II in 1674. In 1682, he was granted a musical doctorate by Cambridge University, and from 1684 until his death was Professor of Music at Cambridge. Following his death on the night of 12–13 June 1700, he was succeeded by John Eccles.

From the few fragments of his compositions that survive, his musical ability is generally regarded to have been slender. His most significant work was his music for John Crowne's masque Calisto, or The Chaste Nymph. His other works include odes for the birthdays of William III (in at least 1693, 1694 and 1696). He also wrote incidental music for John Dryden's Conquest of Granada and Marriage à la Mode, George Etheridge's The Man of Mode, Nathaniel Lee's Gloriana, and Thomas Shadwell's Epsom Wells.

In Tom Brown's Letters from the Dead to the Living, Staggins is described as "bandy legged and contemptuously regarded". Following his death he was buried in Woollon on 16 June 1700 at St. George's Chapel, Windsor.

References

External links

Song from Marriage à la Mode

17th-century births
Year of birth missing
1700 deaths
English Baroque composers
English classical composers
Masters of the King's Music
Alumni of the University of Cambridge
Academics of the University of Cambridge
17th-century classical composers
17th-century English composers
English male classical composers
17th-century male musicians